Langton is a surname. Notable persons with that surname include:
 Anne Langton (1804–1893), English-born Canadian landscape artist and miniaturist and writer
 Arthur Langton (1912–1942), South African cricketer
 Baden Langton, co-anchor of CTV National News
 Bennet Langton (1736–1801), English writer and friend of Samuel Johnson
 Bobby Langton (1918–1996), English footballer
 Brooke Langton (born 1970), American actress
 Charles Langton (1923–1990), English cricketer
 Christopher Langton (born 1948/49), American computer scientist 
 Daniel Langton, British professor of modern Jewish history
 David Langton (1912–1994), British actor
 Emily Langton Langton, also known as Emily Langton Massingberd (1847–1897), women's rights campaigner and temperance activist
 Huw Lloyd-Langton (1951–2012), English guitarist for Hawkwind
 Jane Langton (born 1922), American writer of mysteries and children's literature
Jerry Langton (born 1965) Cando-American author
 Jim Langton (1918–1987), Irish hurler
 John Langton (died 1337), chancellor of England and Bishop of Chichester
 John Langton (1808–1894) British-born Canadian businessman, politician and civil servant
 Marcia Langton (born 1951), Australian scholar
 Rae Langton (born 1963) Australian / British philosopher
 Ray Langton, fictional character in British soap opera Coronation Street
 Samuel Langton (1886–1918), English cricketer
 Simon Langton (died 1248), archbishop (elect) of York, after whom both Simon Langton Grammar Schools are named
 Simon Langton (born 1941),  British television and film director
 Stephen Langton (1150–1228), archbishop of Canterbury
 Steven Langton (born 1983),  American bobsledder
 Thomas Langton (died 1501), archbishop (elect) of Canterbury
 Walter Langton (died 1321), bishop of Coventry and Lichfield and treasurer of England
 William Langton or William of Rotherfield; (died 1279), archbishop (elect) of York and Bishop of Carlisle
 William Langton (died 1659), English lawyer and politician
 Zachary Langton (1698–1788), English clergyman and writer on theological subjects

English-language surnames